Albania participated in the Eurovision Song Contest 2015 in Vienna, Austria, with the song "I'm Alive" performed by Elhaida Dani. Its selected entry was chosen through the national selection competition Festivali i Këngës organised by Radio Televizioni Shqiptar (RTSH) in December 2014. Dani emerged as the winner of contest with the song "Diell", which was withdrawn as the Albanian entry at the request of one of the song's songwriters.

In the first of the Eurovision semi-finals "I'm Alive" placed tenth out of the 16 participating countries, securing its place among the 27 other songs in the final. In Albania's 12th Eurovision appearance on 23 May, "I'm Alive" finished in seventeenth place, receiving 34 points.

Background 

However, its first entry was performed by Anjeza Shahini with the song "The Image of You" finishing in the seventh place, the nation's second-highest placing to date.

The Albanian broadcaster for the 2015 Contest, who broadcast the event in Albania and organised the selection process for its entry, was Radio Televizioni Shqiptar (RTSH). The Albanian contest Festivali i Këngës has been organised every year since 1964 and has been used as Albania's Eurovision selection method since its debut in 2004. Details regarding the 53rd edition of Festivali i Këngës were announced on 12 September 2014, however the Albanian broadcaster formally confirmed their participation in the Eurovision Song Contest 2015 on 1 November 2014, despite previously announcing they would "most likely" be present.

Before Eurovision

Festivali i Këngës 53 

Festivali i Këngës 53 was the 53rd annual edition of the Albanian music competition Festivali i Këngës and the twelfth time the competition was used to determine the artist and song that would represent Albania at the Eurovision Song Contest, this time selecting their 2015 contest entry. The competition consisted of two semi-finals on 26 and 27 December 2014 and a final on 28 December 2014, held at the Palace of Congresses in Tirana. The artistic director of the show was Shpetim Saraçi, the festival director was Bledar Laço, the screenwriter was Mira Tuci and the music production was led by Edmond Zhulali and Alfred Kaçinari. All three shows were hosted by Turjan Hyska, Floriana Garo and Liberta Spahiu.

Format 
The two semi-finals each featured thirteen competing entries. The votes of a jury panel selected nine entries from each semi-final to advance to the final. In the final, the twenty-two competing entries were voted upon by a jury panel in order to select the winner. The seven-person jury panel consisted of:

Evi Reçi – singer
Fatos Baxhaku – journalist, filmmaker
Rona Nishliu – singer, represented Albania in the 2012 contest
David Tukiçi – singer, composer
Alida Hisku – singer
Genc Dashi – musician
Agim Doçi – lyricist

Competing entries 
RTSH invited interested artists and composers to submit their entries between 14 and 15 October 2014. All songs were required to be in the Albanian language, all performers were required to be at least 16 years of age, and singers and composers could only submit one song while lyricists could only submit two songs. The broadcaster received approximately 50 submissions. On 30 October 2014, RTSH announced the thirty artists and songs selected for the competition by a special committee. Three entries were later withdrawn: "Më shiko drejt në sy" written by Andos Sinani and to have been performed by Andos Sinani, "Koha kalon" written by Besa Krasniqi and to have been performed by Besa Krasniqi and "Kënga jeta jonë" written by Enver Shëngjergji and Ylli Mestani and to have been performed by Kozma Dushi. "Kjo natë" performed by Estela Brahimllari was named as the only replacement entry.

Semi-finals 

The first semi-final took place on 26 December 2014 and the second semi-final took place on 27 December 2014. Nine entries from each semi-final qualified to the final based on the votes of a seven-member jury.

Final 

The final took place on 28 December 2014. Nine entries that qualified from each of the two semi-finals, all together eighteen entries, competed. At the conclusion of the show, as voted upon by a seven-member jury who each awarded points from 1 to 8, 10 and 12 to their top ten songs, "Diell" performed by Elhaida Dani was selected as the winner.

Song replacement 

On 23 February 2015, Elhaida Dani issued a statement on social media that "Diell" had been withdrawn by the songwriters due to "personal and irrevocable reasons". Albanian media reported that the song's composer, Aldo Shllaku, requested the withdrawal of the song on 5 February 2015 and refused to transfer rights to the song to the Albanian broadcaster. Shllaku stated he had been excluded from any further developments surrounding the entry after the song won Festivali i Këngës and that he could not take professional responsibility for something where he was not professionally engaged. Dani's statement went on to confirm that she had come to an agreement with RTSH to remain as the Albanian representative at Eurovision but perform a different song. On 24 February, the Albanian broadcaster announced that Elhaida Dani was working with songwriting duo Zzap'n'Chris (Arber Elshani and Kristijan Lekaj) and Sokol Marsi to create the English language song "I'm Alive", which she would perform at the Eurovision Song Contest.

"I'm Alive" was presented along with the official music video on 15 March 2015. In early March, Dani filmed the music video in Tirana, which was directed by Edlira Baholli and produced by ProVideos. On 2 May 2015, the Albanian language version of the song "Në jetë" was released along with a promotional music video.

At Eurovision 

According to Eurovision rules, all nations with the exceptions of the host country and the "Big Five" (France, Germany, Italy, Spain and the United Kingdom) are required to qualify from one of two semi-finals in order to compete for the final; the top ten countries from each semi-final progress to the final. In the 2015 contest, Australia also competed directly in the final as an invited guest nation. The European Broadcasting Union (EBU) split up the competing countries into five different pots based on voting patterns from previous contests, with countries with favourable voting histories put into the same pot. On 26 January 2015, a special allocation draw was held which placed each country into one of the two semi-finals, as well as which half of the show they would perform in. Albania was placed into the first semi-final, to be held on 19 May 2015, and was scheduled to perform in the second half of the show.

Once all the competing songs for the 2015 contest had been released, the running order for the semi-finals was decided by the shows' producers rather than through another draw, so that similar songs were not placed next to each other. Albania was set to perform in position 14, following the entry from Denmark and before the entry from Romania.

All three shows were broadcast in Albania on TVSH, RTSH HD, RTSH Muzikë and Radio Tirana with commentary by Andri Xhahu. The Albanian spokesperson, who announced the Albanian votes during the final, was Andri Xhahu.

Semi-final

Elhaida Dani took part in technical rehearsals on 12 and 15 May, followed by dress rehearsals on 18 and 19 May. This included the jury final where professional juries of each country, responsible for 50 percent of each country's vote, watched and voted on the competing entries.

The stage show featured Elhaida Dani dressed in a black costume with an attached cape that had embedded crystals. Dani delivered the song from the centre of the stage while three female backing vocalists were set to her side, dressed in black outfits. The stage lighting created a dark atmosphere with the background LED screens displaying moving rays and shapes in yellow and cream colours. The three backing vocalists that joined Elhaida Dani on stage were Gerona Hyska, Olsa Papandili and Erga Halilaj.

At the end of the show, Albania was announced as having finished in the top ten and subsequently qualifying for the grand final. It was later revealed that Albania placed tenth in the semi-final, receiving a total of 62 points.

Final
Shortly after the first semi-final, a winner's press conference was held for the ten qualifying countries. As part of this press conference, the qualifying artists took part in a draw to determine which half of the grand final they would subsequently participate in. This draw was done in the order the countries were announced during the semi-final. Albania was drawn to compete in the second half. Following this draw, the shows' producers decided upon the running order of the final, as they had done for the semi-finals. Albania was subsequently placed to perform in position 26, following the entry from Russia and before the entry from Italy.

Dani once again took part in dress rehearsals on 22 and 23 May before the final, including the jury final where the professional juries cast their final votes before the live show. In her performance during the final on 23 May, Elhaida Dani changed her semi-final outfit to a long black dress. At the conclusion of the voting, Albania finished in seventeenth place with 34 points.

Voting
Voting during the three shows consisted of 50 percent public televoting and 50 percent from a jury deliberation. The jury consisted of five music industry professionals who were citizens of the country they represent, with their names published before the contest to ensure transparency. This jury was asked to judge each contestant based on: vocal capacity; the stage performance; the song's composition and originality; and the overall impression by the act. In addition, no member of a national jury could be related in any way to any of the competing acts in such a way that they cannot vote impartially and independently. The individual rankings of each jury member were released shortly after the grand final.

Following the release of the full split voting by the EBU after the conclusion of the competition, it was revealed that Albania had placed ninth with the public televote and twenty-sixth with the jury vote in the final. In the public vote, Albania scored 93 points, while with the jury vote, Albania scored 4 points. In the first semi-final, Albania placed eighth with the public televote with 66 points and ninth with the jury vote, scoring 61 points.

Below is a breakdown of points awarded to Albania and awarded by Albania in the first semi-final and grand final of the contest, and the breakdown of the jury voting and televoting conducted during the two shows:

Points awarded to Albania

Points awarded by Albania

Detailed voting results
The following members comprised the Albanian jury:
 Bojken Lako (jury chairperson)TV and theatre director
 Klodian Qafokucomposer
 Olsa Toqicomposer
 Arta Markujournalist
 violinist

References

External links  

 

2015
Countries in the Eurovision Song Contest 2015
2014
Eurovision
Eurovision